Jenifer fait son live is the name of the first live album recorded by French singer Jenifer Bartoli. It was recorded during Jenifer's first live tour at Zenith of Paris, on April 12 and 13, 2005.  The album contains a new version of "Serre-moi", a song available on Jenifer's previous album Le Passage. It was released on October 3, 2005 and was a success in France and Belgium (Wallonia), where it reached the top ten.

Formats and track listing
 CD album

 CD 2

 "Tom's Diner"
 "Serre-moi"

 DVD

The DVD contains the same track listing. It was recorded on November 9, 2005.

Charts and sales

Weekly charts

Year-end charts

Certifications

References

Jenifer (singer) albums
2005 live albums
2005 video albums
Live video albums